Liu Minghu (born 28 July 1998) is a Chinese freestyle wrestler. He is a silver medalist at the Asian Wrestling Championships. He competed in the men's 57 kg event at the 2020 Summer Olympics held in Tokyo, Japan.

Career 

He represented China at the 2018 Asian Games in Jakarta, Indonesia in the men's freestyle 57 kg event. In 2019, he won the silver medal in the men's 61 kg event at the Asian Wrestling Championships held in Xi'an, China.

He qualified at the 2021 Asian Wrestling Olympic Qualification Tournament to represent China at the 2020 Summer Olympics in Tokyo, Japan.

He competed in the 61kg event at the 2022 World Wrestling Championships held in Belgrade, Serbia.

Achievements

References

External links 
 

Living people
1998 births
People from Beihai
Chinese male sport wrestlers
Wrestlers at the 2018 Asian Games
Asian Games competitors for China
Asian Wrestling Championships medalists
Wrestlers at the 2020 Summer Olympics
Olympic wrestlers of China
21st-century Chinese people